Annie M. Pence is a steamboat that ran on Puget Sound in the early 1890s.

Career
Annie M. Pence was built at Lummi Island in 1890.  The boat was a sternwheeler intended to carry freight.  For most of the career of Annie M. Pence, the vessel was under the command of Capt. Peter Falk, who was also one of their owners. Annie M. Pence was purchased by the La Conner Trading and Transportation Company as one of the company's first steamboats. Anna M. Pence was destroyed by a fire 21 June 1895 near Point Lowell in Puget Sound. Her crew escaped to a scow she was towing, except for her Cook who drowned.  The hull was still usable, and was incorporated into the construction of the propeller steamer T.W. Lake in 1896.

References 

 Newell, Gordon R., Ships of the Inland Sea, Superior, Seattle WA (2nd Ed. 1960)
 Newell, Gordon R., ed., H.W. McCurdy Marine History of the Pacific Northwest,  Superior Publishing Co., Seattle, WA (1966)
 

1890 ships
Steamboats of Washington (state)
Sternwheelers of Washington (state)